Joe Garbutt may refer to:

Joe Garbutt (footballer, born 1878) (1878–1948), Australian rules footballer for South Melbourne
Joe Garbutt Jr. (1903–1971), Australian rules footballer for St Kilda